Bertea is a commune in Prahova County, Muntenia, Romania. It is composed of two villages, Bertea and Lutu Roșu.

References

Bertea
Localities in Muntenia